1979 saw many sequels and prequels in video games, such as Space Invaders Part II and Super Speed Race, along with new titles such as Asteroids, Football, Galaxian, Head On, Heiankyo Alien, Monaco GP , Sheriff and Warrior. For the second year in a row, the highest-grossing video game was Taito's arcade game Space Invaders and the best-selling home system was the Atari Video Computer System (Atari VCS).

Financial performance

Highest-grossing arcade games
Space Invaders was the top-grossing video game worldwide in 1979, having become the arcade game industry's all-time best-seller by 1979. The following table lists the year's top-grossing arcade game in Japan, the United Kingdom, United States, and worldwide.

Japan
In Japan, the following titles were the highest-grossing arcade games of 1979, according to the annual Game Machine chart. Taito's Space Invaders was the highest-grossing arcade game for a second year in a row.

United States
The following titles were the top ten highest-grossing arcade video games of 1979 in the United States, according to Cash Box, Play Meter and RePlay magazines.

Best-selling home systems

Major awards
Electronic Games magazine hosted the first Arkie Awards in 1980, for games in 1979.

Business
 New companies: Activision, Capcom, Edu-Ware, Infocom, Quicksilva, Strategic Simulations

Notable releases

Games 
Arcade
 April – Sega's dot-eating driving game, Head On, is released. It becomes a popular concept to clone, especially for home systems.
 August – Atari releases Lunar Lander, the first arcade version of a game concept created on minicomputers ten years earlier.
 November – Atari releases the vector graphics-based Asteroids, which becomes Atari's second best selling game of all time and displaces Space Invaders as the most popular game in the US.
 November – Namco releases fixed shooter Galaxian in full color.
 November – Vectorbeam releases Tail Gunner, a space shooter with a first-person perspective.
 December – Nintendo releases Radar Scope, featuring a pseudo-3D, third-person perspective. Later, 2000 out of 3000 manufactured machines are converted to Donkey Kong.
 Cinematronics releases Warrior, one of the first fighting games without a boxing theme.
 Sega releases the vertically scrolling Monaco GP, featuring full color and day/night driving. It is one of Sega's last discrete logic (no CPU) hardware designs.

Computer
 August – Automated Simulations releases Temple of Apshai, one of the first graphical role-playing games for home computers. It remains the best-selling computer RPG through to 1982.
 October – subLOGIC releases Flight Simulator for the Apple II.
 Richard Garriott creates Akalabeth, a computer role-playing game for the Apple II. It launches Garriott's career and is a precursor to his highly successful Ultima series.
 Richard Bartle and Roy Trubshaw create what is commonly recognized as the first playable MUD.
 Atari, Inc.'s 8K Star Raiders cartridge is released and becomes a system seller for the new Atari 400/800 computer line.

Hardware
Computer
 June – Texas Instruments releases the TI-99/4. It is the first home computer with a 16-bit processor and, with TI's TMS9918 video chip, one of the first with hardware sprites.
 September – NEC releases the PC-8001, the first in the PC-8000 series of home computers.
 November – Atari, Inc. releases the first two models in the Atari 8-bit family: the Atari 400 and Atari 800 home computers. They feature custom graphics and sound coprocessors which support sprites, four-channel audio, and programmable display modes.

Console
 Mattel test markets the Intellivision console in Fresno, California.  It is released throughout the United States in 1980.

Handheld
 November – Milton Bradley Company releases the Microvision, the first handheld game console that uses interchangeable cartridges.

See also
1979 in games

Notes

References

Video games
Video games by year